Enchomyia is a genus of parasitic flies in the family Tachinidae. There are at least three described species in Enchomyia.

Species
These three species belong to the genus Enchomyia:
 Enchomyia erythrocera (Bigot, 1888)
 Enchomyia penai Cortes, 1971
 Enchomyia shewelli Cortes, 1976

References

Further reading

 
 
 
 

Tachinidae
Articles created by Qbugbot